The 2017 FIBA 3x3 World Tour Saskatoon Masters was a 3x3 basketball tournament held in Saskatoon, Saskatchewan, Canada at a temporary venue constructed at the intersections of 4th Avenue and 21st Street from July 15–16, 2017. It was the first stop on the 2017 FIBA 3x3 World Tour. The top team, Ljubljana qualified for the 2017 FIBA 3x3 World Tour Final.

Participants
12 teams qualified to participate at the Saskatoon Masters. The United Arab Emirates' team Novi Sad Al-Wahda qualified but later withdrew from the tournament due to visa issues and was replaced by the Czech Team Humpolec. As well, Team Manta from Ecuador also was forced to withdraw due to visa issues and Team Hamilton from Canada replaced them.

Preliminary round

Pool A

|}

Pool B

|}

Pool C

|}

Pool D

|}

Final Round

Final standings

References

External links
Saskatoon Masters Official Website

2017 FIBA 3x3 World Tour
International basketball competitions hosted by Canada
2016–17 in Canadian basketball
Sports competitions in Saskatoon